Old Appleton Bridge is a historic Pratt Truss Iron Bridge located at Old Appleton, Cape Girardeau County and Perry County, Missouri. It was built in 1879, and consists of a wrought iron, pin-connected, Pratt through truss main span, with two pin-connected, three panel Pratt pony-truss approach spans. It rests on limestone block masonry piers.

It was listed on the National Register of Historic Places in 2009.

See also

References

Bridges on the National Register of Historic Places in Missouri
Bridges completed in 1879
Buildings and structures in Cape Girardeau County, Missouri
Buildings and structures in Perry County, Missouri
National Register of Historic Places in Cape Girardeau County, Missouri
Wrought iron bridges in the United States
Pratt truss bridges in the United States
Road bridges in Missouri
1879 establishments in Missouri